The 1983 Northern Illinois Huskies football team represented Northern Illinois University as a member of the Mid-American Conference (MAC) during 1983 NCAA Division I-A football season. Led by Bill Mallory in his fourth and final season as head coach, the Huskies compiled an overall record of 10–2  with a mark of 8–1 in conference play, winning he MAC title. Northern Illinois was invited to the California Bowl, where they beat played Cal State Fullerton. The team played home games at Huskie Stadium in DeKalb, Illinois.

The Huskies won their conference championship since 1965, since the 1965 team won the Interstate Intercollegiate Athletic Conference (IIAC) title during the final years of the conference's existence. The Huskies' trip to the California Bowl was also their first bowl game since 1965 and first bowl win since the 1963 team won the Mineral Water Bowl and was ranked atop the AP small college football rankings.

Schedule

References

Northern Illinois
Northern Illinois Huskies football seasons
Mid-American Conference football champion seasons
Northern Illinois Huskies football